Munich Heimeranplatz is a railway and Munich U-Bahn interchange station. It sits on the border of two Munich boroughs, Laim and Schwanthalerhöhe. It offers transfer between S-Bahn and U-Bahn as well as local bus services and serves as a transportation hub for the Westend and eastern Laim.

The subway runs in a tunnel in a roughly east–west direction, while the S-Bahn's two platforms – a middle platform for the S 7 service and a single-side platform for the S 20 – are situated on an elevated level on an overpass on the Garmischer Straße stretch of Munich's central ring road, the Mittlerer Ring. In the northern direction, the S-Bahn tracks split, with S20 continuing west towards Pasing and S7 continuing east towards Donnersbergerbrücke. The S-Bahn station is located to the west of the subway station, necessitating a short walk alongside an elevated sidewalk.

Name 
The station is named after the adjacent Heimeranplatz, north-east of the station. The square, in turn, is named after Ernst Heimeran, a Munich author and publisher. The Mittlerer Ring orbital road passes under Heimeranplatz, in a stretch called the Trappentreu tunnel, Munich's first tunnel on the ring road.

Notable places nearby
Bavariapark
Westpark
Theresienwiese
Rudi-Sedlmayer-Halle/Audi Dome

References

External links

Railway stations in Germany opened in 1984
Heimeranplatz
1984 establishments in West Germany
Heimeranplatz
Heimeranplatz